Melanopula is a genus of harvestmen in the family Sclerosomatidae from South and Southeast Asia.

Species
 Melanopula biceps Roewer, 1929
 Melanopula cambodiana S. Suzuki, 1984
 Melanopula crassipes Suzuki, 1977
 Melanopula crassitarsis Roewer, 1955
 Melanopula shanensis Roewer, 1955

References

Harvestmen
Harvestman genera